Shirley Murdock! is the debut studio album by the American soul singer Shirley Murdock. The album was released on February 18, 1986, and included the charting singles "Be Free", "As We Lay" and "Go on Without You".

Track listing

Personnel
Adapted from AllMusic

Shirley Murdock – primary artist, composer, vocals
Roger – congas, drums, guitar, horn, keyboards, Electric piano, background vocals
Gregory Jackson – keyboards, background vocals
Robert "Rumba" Jones – cheng, congas
Roger Lynch – keyboards
Billy Beck – keyboards, background vocals
Aaron Blackmon – guitar, rhythm guitar, horn
Sherman Fleetwood – horn
Larry Troutman – cheng, background vocals
Lester Troutman – drums
Dale Degroat – keyboards, background vocals
Jannetta Boyce – background vocals
Raymond Davis – background vocals
Larry Hatcher – background vocals
Michael Warren – engineer

References

1986 debut albums
Shirley Murdock albums
Elektra Records albums